James Banks was an English footballer who played in the Football League for Blackpool, his only known club. He made eleven League appearances during the 1897–98 season.

References

English footballers
English Football League players
Year of birth missing
Year of death missing
Blackpool F.C. players
Association football forwards